Muzahdorf is an island located in Dahlak, Eritrea. It surrounded by the waters of the Red Sea. Muzahdorf is also a part of Dahlak Marine Park. During the Eritrean–Ethiopian War the marine wildlife has been growing, which has beneficial for tourism in Eritrea. The park is protected by the Eritrean government.

References 

Dahlak Archipelago